Lino Pierdica was an Italian bobsledder who competed in the late 1950s. He won a silver medal in the four-man event at the 1957 FIBT World Championships in St. Moritz.

References
Bobsleigh four-man world championship medalists since 1930

Italian male bobsledders
Possibly living people
Year of birth missing